The pygmy sculpin (Cottus paulus) is a species of ray-finned fish belonging to the family Cottidae, the typical sculpins. It is endemic to Alabama in the United States. It inhabits Coldwater Spring and its associated spring run in the Coosa River and Choccolocco Creek systems.

This fish produces sounds during courtship and conflict.

References

Endemic fauna of Alabama
Fish of North America
Cottus (fish)
Fish described in 2000
Taxonomy articles created by Polbot
ESA threatened species